Teacher, Teacher may refer to:

Books
Teacher, Teacher!, first book in the teacher novels series by Jack Sheffield#Books, 2007

Music
"Teacher, Teacher" (Johnny Mathis song), written by Al Stillman and Robert Allen, 1958
"Teacher, Teacher", single by Gene Chandler, written by Keni Lewis and Eugene Dixon, 1968
"Teacher, Teacher", single by The Maytals, written by Toots Hibbert, 1971
"Teacher, Teacher" (Rockpile song), written by Eddie Phillips and Kenny Pickett, 1980
"Teacher, Teacher" (38 Special song), 1984
"Teacher Teacher" (AKB48 song), 2018
"Teacher, Teacher", single by Jinjer from Micro EP, 2019

Television
"Teacher, Teacher", February 5, 1969 episode of Hallmark Hall of Fame, 21st Primetime Emmy Awards#Programs winner
"Teacher, Teacher", December 2, 1990 episode on List of Parker Lewis Can't Lose episodes
"Teacher, Teacher", November 16, 1996 episode of Bailey Kipper's P.O.V.#Transmission details